For the 1939 musical, see The Hot Mikado (1939 production)
For the 1986 musical, see Hot Mikado